NGC 460 is an open cluster with nebula located in the constellation Tucana. It was possibly observed on August 1, 1826, by James Dunlop, although it was officially discovered on April 11, 1834, by John Herschel. It was described by Dreyer as "very faint (in Nubecular Minor).", with Nubecular Minor being the Small Magellanic Cloud. It was also described by DeLisle Stewart as "faint, pretty large, irregularly round, gradually brighter middle, mottled but not resolved, 2nd of several."

References

0460
18340411
Tucana (constellation)
Open clusters
Small Magellanic Cloud